Mirair Gabriela Ngirmang (1922 – 10 October 2007) was a peace and anti-nuclear activist from Palau.

Background 
Ngirmang was born in 1922 in Palau. Her father is from Airai and mother from Koror. Both her parents held high-ranking positions within their clans.

Growing up in Palau while it was under Japanese administration, and then during World War II, Ngirmang received very limited formal education. She was considered a matriarch of Ikelau clan and held the title of 'Mirair', the second woman’s title in Koror, for over twelve years.

Career 
Ngirmang is considered to have been instrumental in creating the world's first nuclear-free constitution, banning the use, storage, and disposal of nuclear weaponry in Palau. The constitution came into effect in 1979 and was passed with the support of 92% of the population. The document included a clause that required agreement from 75% of voters before nuclear weapons could be brought into the country. Between 1979–1994 the constitutional clause was voted on, and upheld, eleven times.

For fifty years Ngirmang led the women's organisation Otil a Beluad (which can be translated to 'anchor of our land’) and continued to defend the nuclear-free clause in the constitution. Ngirmang's daughter, Cita Morei, was also a prominent member of the movement.

In 1987, when the Palauan government attempted to amend the clause to require a simple majority rather than 75% support, Ngirmang led a group of fifty women elders and took the government to court. During this time, the elders were threatened and Ngirmang's house was firebombed. Seeking support, she travelled to United States, including addressing the United Nations and United States Congress. However, in 1989 the case was taken back to court and government unilaterally amended the clause to require only 50% voter support.

In 1988, the organization Ngirmang led, Otil A Beluad was nominated for a Nobel Peace Prize, and in 2005 she was individually nominated for a Nobel Peace Prize by the Swiss-based 1000 Women for Peace campaign. In 1993 Otil A Beluad received the Global 500 Award from the United Nations Environment Programme.

See also
 List of peace activists

References

Further reading 
'Celebrating the life of Gabriela Ngirmang of Palau (Belau)', Zohl de Ishtar (2008) Capitalism Nature Socialism, 19 1: 141-144.

1922 births
2007 deaths
Palauan women
Palauan activists
Anti–nuclear weapons activists
People from Koror
People from Airai